American Fangs was a five-piece alternative rock band from Houston, Texas.

Background
The Fangs' all share one mother, yet were sired by the same father. Their first album, American Fangs EP, was released in January 2009, followed by their self-titled LP in May 2013 via In De Goot. The band later produced an EP titled Pomona and the full-length album Dirty Legs, released in 2015 through Best Before Records with tracks produced by Machine, recorded and mixed in Austin Texas.

Their single "Pomona" spent over a month in top give on Sirius XM Octane radio chart, peaking at #2. The "Pomona" music video featured on VEVO possesses over 62,000 views.

American Fangs opened for Deftones, Papa Roach, Fall Out Boy, Hollywood Undead, Middle Class Rut, Sevendust, and others.

The festivals that the band have performed on include Download Festival, SXSW, Ship Rocked, Rock on the Range, Carolina Rebellion, Rocklahoma, Free Press Summer Fest, KFMA Fall Ball, Festapalooza Shreveport.

Rocksound listed them as one of 'The 9 New Bands You Need In Your Life Right Now'

The group made news when a man claiming to be a vampire assaulted a member of the band during a May 2013 performance at the La Crosse Center and drove a barricade through a window of the tour bus, according to police reports.

Members

 Gabriel Cavazos - vocals
 Micah Miller - drums
 Kyle Shimek - bass, vocals
 Kenyon “Spaghetti Basket” Puntenney - guitar, vocals
 Chris Goodwin - guitar, vocals

Discography
Dirty Legs (LP) (2015)
Self-Titled (LP) (2013)
Pomona (EP) (2013)
Self-Titled (EP) (2009)

References

Rock music groups from Texas
Musical groups established in 2008
Best Before Records artists